Tallaboa Alta Barrio is a barrio in the municipality of Peñuelas, Puerto Rico. Its population in 2010 was 3,784.

History
Tallaboa was an important village, led by "beloved caciques", before the Spanish and European colonization of Puerto Rico in the late 15th century.

Puerto Rico was ceded by Spain in the aftermath of the Spanish–American War under the terms of the Treaty of Paris of 1898 and became an unincorporated territory of the United States. In 1899, the United States Department of War conducted a census of Puerto Rico finding that the population of Tallaboa Alta barrio was 946.

See also

 List of communities in Puerto Rico

References

Barrios of Peñuelas, Puerto Rico